Nukabad (also Romanized as Nūkābād and Nok Abad) is a city in and capital of Central District, in Taftan County, Sistan and Baluchestan Province, Iran. At the 2006 census, its population was 2,821, in 623 families.

References

Populated places in Khash County

Cities in Sistan and Baluchestan Province